New Manor Town is an affordable housing project in the town of Manor, India. The housing complex is in close proximity to the industrial towns of Palghar and Boisar.

Location
New Manor Town is located 78 km from Mumbai in the newly formed Palghar district, now considered a part of Mumbai's Extended Western Suburb. It is well connected via rail and road. Palghar is the nearest railway station on the Mumbai's Western Line (Mumbai Suburban Railway) while the Mumbai-Ahmedabad National Highway 8 (India) connects Manor to Mumbai. The Manor-Wada Road conveniently connects to Nashik and the interiors of Maharashtra.

Employment centers
 MIDC Tarapur, Maharashtra's largest industrial belt, is located 30 min from Manor
 Palghar, the district headquarters of Maharashtra's 36th and newest district, is only 20 min from New Manor Town

Rapid urbanization
The newly formed Palghar district is home to almost 3 million people and has seen population growth of 40% between 2001-2011 as per the Census of India. Palghar's population growth rate even overshadows Thane's growth of 36% during the same period. Being 35% urbanized, the newly formed district has a population density of 562/km2, making it more densely populated than Poona. Thanks to the 'Housing for All' government scheme and the Make In India initiative to boost manufacturing, this industrial area can be expected to prosper, especially considering its proximity to Mumbai, India's business capital.

Infrastructure
New Manor Town was made self-sustainable by placing civic infrastructure like schools, colleges, hospitals and banks within walking distance from the market place. Additionally, travelling is made convenient by taxis to Palghar and Boisar.

Riddhi Siddhi Builders by Kamath Group is a mini township that offers 1 & 2 BHK flats with plenty of fresh air and peaceful surroundings. The residential complex has been built Khushi Aangan by Mr Sunil Jain and Riddhi Siddhi Builders by Mr Sudhakar Kamath.

References

External links
Palghar Census 2011
Housing for All by 2022
Google Maps location

Palghar district
Buildings and structures in Maharashtra